The Professor of Physic (the term for medicine at the time the post was created in 1597) at Gresham College in London, England, gives free educational lectures to the general public on medicine, health and related sciences. The college was founded to give public lectures in 1597 (New Style). Professors of Physic and more recently visiting Professors have been giving public lectures on major topics in medicine in London since 1597; recently these have also been put on line as a free resource for a wider public including outside the UK. Gresham Professors have included some of the leading scientists in Britain including Sir Christopher Wren and Robert Boyle. Gresham Professors of Physic listed below included leaders in medicine, public health, surgery and clinical science. In addition eminent medical scientists and physicians were Gresham Professors of other disciplines, such as Sir William Petty, one of the founders of demography (Gresham Professor of Music from 1651).

The Professor of Physic is always appointed by the Mercers' Side of the Joint Grand Gresham Committee, a body administered jointly by the Worshipful Company of Mercers and the City of London Corporation.

List of Gresham Professors of Physic

References
Gresham College old website, Internet Archive List of professors

Notes

Further reading
 

Physic
1596 establishments in England